The Klingspor Type Foundry was a German hot metal type foundry established in 1892 when Carl Klingspor bought out the Rudhard’sche Foundry of Offenbach. His sons, Karl and younger brother Wilhelm, took on the business in 1904, renaming the foundry Gebrüder Klingspor in 1906, and turned it into a major concern. Famous type designers like Rudolf Koch, Walter Tiemann and Otto Eckmann worked for this foundry and created well known typefaces like Koch Antiqua, Wilhelm Klingspor, Tiemann Antiqua and Eckmann.

Starting in 1925, Klingspor types were distributed in the United States by Continental Type Founders Association.

The foundry closed in 1956 when it was acquired by D. Stempel AG, which had held a majority stake in the company since 1917. The right of the typefaces was transferred to D. Stempel AG, Frankfurt am Main which then had been transferred to Linotype.  Many original designs can be seen in the Klingspor Museum in Offenbach am Main.

Typefaces
These foundry types were produced by the Klingspor Foundry:

References

External links
Klingspor-Museum, Offenbach
Gebrüder Klingspor at www.typophile.com

Offenbach am Main
Letterpress font foundries of Germany
Companies based in Hesse